The following list shows all recipients of the Country Music Association's (CMA) Founding President's Award, instituted as the Connie B. Gay Award. The award was established in 1963, as an honor of high prestige in recognition of the most outstanding service to the CMA by a member not currently serving as an officer or director. Connie B. Gay, co-founder and first president of the CMA funded the award with his personal assets and established a trust, in his will, to ensure the perpetual viability of this award beyond his lifetime.

1960s
 1963 Richard Frank
 1964 Joe Allison
 1965 Robert J. Burton 
 1966 Pack Ackerman
 1967 Gene Nash, Leroy Van Dyke
 1968 Owen Bradley
 1969 Johnny Cash

1970s
 1970 Frank Clement
 1971 Ken Nelson
 1972 Tex Ritter
 1973 Frank Jones
 1974 Jack Stapp
 1975 Hubert Long (posthumously)
 1976 Roy Horton
 1977 Hal Cook
 1978 Bob Tubert
 1979 Ben Smathers

1980s
 1980 Charlie Daniels
 1981 Roy Acuff
 1982 Bob Boatman
 1983 Mary Ann McCready
 1984 Frank Mull
 1985 Jim Halsey
 1986 Merrill Warner
 1987 Paul Conroy
 1988 Ron Huntsman
 1989 Michael Sukin

1990s
 1990 Allen Brown
 1991 Bob Saporiti
 1992 Jim Free
 1993 Fred Rappoport
 1994 Helen Farmer
 1995 Cindy Wilson
 1996 Marc Oswald
 1997 Trisha Yearwood
 1998 Pam Tillis
 1999 Martina McBride

2000s
 2000 Wayne Halper
 2001 Mayor Bill Purcell
 2002 Brad Paisley
 2003 Wynonna Judd
 2004 Terri Clark
 2005 Blue County (Aaron Benward and Scott Reeves)
 2006 No Award given
 2007 No Award given
 2008 No Award given
 2009 No Award given

2010s
 2010 ?
 2011 ?
 2012 ?

References

Members of the Country Music Association